Anna Tatishvili and Heather Watson were the defending champions, but Watson chose not to participate. Tatishvili partnered with Louisa Chirico, but they withdrew before playing their first round.

Julie Coin and Emily Webley-Smith won the title, defeating Jacqueline Cako and Sachia Vickery in the final, 4–6, 7–6(7–4), [11–9].

Seeds

Draw

External Links
 Draw

Dow Corning Tennis Classic - Doubles
Dow Corning Tennis Classic